Embraced was a Swedish melodic black metal band formed in Malmö in 1993. They released their first demo in 1997, and signed with Regain Records, they then toured Sweden, Finland, and Germany. After adding another keyboardist and guitarist, they released their full-length Amorous Anathema in 1998. The follow-up Within appeared in 2000. The band split up in 2000, and reunited in 2004, but since there was no news from the band its status is still unknown.

Band members

Last known lineup 
Michael Håkansson – bass (1993–2001, 2004–?)
Peter Mårdklint – guitars (1993–2001, 2004–?)
Kalle Johansson – vocals (1993–2001, 2004–?)
Sven Karlsson – keyboards (1995–2001, 2004–?)
Davor Tepic – guitars (1997–2001, 2004–?)
Julius Chmielewski – keyboards (1997–2001, 2004–?)
Thomas Lejon – drums (1999–2001, 2004–?)

Past members 
Daniel Lindberg – drums (1995–1998)
Andreas Albin – drums (1998)

Discography 
A Journey Into Melancholy (demo, 1997)
 Amorous Anathema (Regain Records, 1998)
 Within'' (Regain Records, 2000)

References 

Swedish black metal musical groups
Swedish melodic death metal musical groups
Blackened death metal musical groups
Musical groups established in 1993
1993 establishments in Sweden